snRNP70 also known as U1 small nuclear ribonucleoprotein 70 kDa is a protein that in humans is encoded by the SNRNP70 gene. snRNP70 is a small nuclear ribonucleoprotein that associates with U1 spliceosomal RNA, forming the U1snRNP a core component of the spliceosome. The U1-70K protein and other components of the spliceosome complex form detergent-insoluble aggregates in both sporadic and familial human cases of Alzheimer's disease. U1-70K co-localizes with Tau in neurofibrillary tangles in Alzheimer's disease.

Interactions 

snRNP70 has been shown to interact with ASF/SF2, SRPK1,  and ZRANB2.

Role in autoimmunity
Antibodies towards snRNP70 are associated with mixed connective tissue disease.

References

Further reading 

 
 
 
 
 
 
 
 
 
 
 
 
 
 
 
 
 
 

Protein complexes
Spliceosome
RNA splicing